The 2017–18 season was Milton Keynes Dons' 14th season in their existence, and their second consecutive season in League One, the third tier of English football. Along with competing in League One, the club also competed in the FA Cup, EFL Cup and EFL Trophy.

The season covers the period from 1 July 2017 to 30 June 2018.

Competitions

League One

Final table

Source: Sky Sports

Matches

FA Cup

Matches

EFL Cup

Matches

EFL Trophy

Southern Group G Table

Matches

Player details
 Note: Players' ages as of the club's opening fixture of the 2017–18 season.

Transfers

Transfers in

Transfers out

Loans in

Loans out

Awards
 EFL Young Player of the Month (September): Callum Brittain

References

External links

Official Supporters Association website
MK Dons news on MKWeb

Milton Keynes Dons
Milton Keynes Dons F.C. seasons